Angelfall is a post-apocalyptic fantasy novel written by Korean-American author Susan Ee. It is the first book in the Penryn & the End Of Days trilogy. The story is narrated by Penryn Young, a 17-year-old girl living in the San Francisco Bay, which has been attacked by angels. The book has been translated to more than 20 languages and was one of the finalists for the Best Fantasy and Fiction Book in the 2011 Cybils Award. It was also one of the top 5 E-book UK Bestsellers in Amazon. In November 2012, the movie rights was picked up by Good Universe. A sequel, World After, was released the following year. The final book End of Days was released in May 2015.

Synopsis 
It's been six weeks since angels of the apocalypse descended to demolish the modern world. Street gangs rule the day while fear and superstition rule the night. When warrior angels fly away with a helpless little girl, her seventeen-year-old sister Penryn will do anything to get her back.

Anything, including making a deal with an enemy angel.

Raffe is a warrior who lies broken and wingless on the street. After eons of fighting his own battles, he finds himself being rescued from a desperate situation by a half-starved teenage girl.

Traveling through a dark and twisted Northern California, they have only each other to rely on for survival. Together, they journey toward the angels' stronghold in San Francisco where she'll risk everything to rescue her sister and he'll put himself at the mercy of his greatest enemies for the chance to be made whole again.

Background and inspirations 
Susan Ee has stated that she has been fascinated with angels for a long time. Most classic angels were portrayed as destroyers and creatures of doom, but today, they are portrayed as guardian angels. Ee decided to follow the original portrayal of angels. The main character was named after the exit off Highway 80 in California, where she regularly used to drive by. The book was first self-published by Ee due to personal reasons. She wrote the first draft of Angelfall, hoping that she could acquire a small group of readers interested in the story. It was later published by Amazon Children's Publishing on August 28, 2012.

Reception 
The book received positive reviews by most critics. Publishers Weekly described it as a fresh romance with well-developed characters, atmosphere, and strong writing.  The Guardian UK gave a positive review.
The book has been translated to more than 20 languages and was one of the finalists for the Best Fantasy and Fiction Book in the 2011 Cybils Award. It was also one of the top 5 E-book UK Bestsellers in Amazon. UK GRAZIE magazine described it as the "next big thing" in the wake of Twilight and Hunger Games. It was one of the top rated books of Entertainment Weekly.
Angelfall was selected as one of the 100 Best Fantasy Books of all Time by Time magazine.

Film adaptation 
On September 13, 2011, Angelfall acquired a major film agent to represent its film rights.
In November 2012, the movie rights was picked up by Good Universe and Ghost House Pictures.

References

External links 

 Official Author's Blog

American young adult novels
2011 American novels
Post-apocalyptic novels
Young adult fantasy novels
Novels set in San Francisco